Emmett is an unincorporated community in Logan County, West Virginia, United States. Emmett had a post office, which closed on March 7, 1998.

The community was named after Franklin Emmett King, a mining official.

References

Unincorporated communities in Logan County, West Virginia
Unincorporated communities in West Virginia
Coal towns in West Virginia